Jim or Jimmy Watson may refer to:

Politics
Jim Watson (Canadian politician) (born 1961), mayor of Ottawa, Canada
Jim Watson (English politician) (?–2013), former mayor of Blackburn, U.K.
Jim Watson (Illinois politician) (born 1965), state representative from Illinois, U.S.

Sports
Jimmy Watson (Irish footballer) (19th century), fullback for Ulster and Ireland
Jimmy Watson (footballer, born 1877) (1877–1942), Scottish fullback who played for Sunderland, Middlesbrough, and Scotland
Jimmy Watson (footballer, born 1914) (1914–1979), English footballer who played inside-forward for Gillingham
Jimmy Watson (footballer, born 1924) (1924–1996), Scottish footballer who played striker for Motherwell and Huddersfield Town
Jim Watson (Australian footballer) (1896–1978), Australian rules footballer for Carlton and Fitzroy
Jim Watson (ice hockey) (born 1943), Canadian ice hockey player who played for the NHL's Detroit Red Wings and Buffalo Sabres
Jimmy Watson (ice hockey) (born 1952), Canadian ice hockey player who played for the NHL's Philadelphia Flyers
Jim Watson (sportscaster), American host and announcer for Fox Sports and NBC Sports

Other
Jim Watson (actor), Canadian television actor
Jim Watson (biologist) (1943–2017), New Zealand bio-technologist and entrepreneur
Jim Watson (guitarist), early member of the band 311
Jimmy Watson Memorial Trophy, awarded annually at the Royal Melbourne Wine Show
Jim Watson (artist) (1932–2017), British comics artist

See also 
James Watson (disambiguation)
Jamie Watson (disambiguation)